Tyler Donati (born October 17, 1986) is a Canadian professional ice hockey right wing, currently playing for the Brampton Beast of the ECHL. Tyler is the identical twin of hockey player Justin Donati, only older than Justin by 7 minutes. Though neither brother has been drafted, both attended the Detroit Red Wings rookie camp in 2006.

Playing career
On January 8, 2005 Tyler, along with brother Justin Donati, was acquired from the Oshawa Generals to the Toronto St. Michael's Majors for Cal Clutterbuck. Tyler played alongside of Justin on the Toronto St. Michael's Majors of the OHL, but this was ended when Tyler was traded to the Belleville Bulls. Tyler and his brother both attended the Detroit Red Wings rookie camp as non-draft invitees in August/September 2006 and played well, both producing points regularly throughout the tournament games. His 2010-11 season with the Elmira Jackals was cut short after being side-lined due to shoulder surgery.

On May 23, 2012, Donati left for Europe to join Vålerenga Ishockey of the GET-ligaen in Oslo, Norway. After two seasons abroad, Donati returned to his home province of Ontario, in signing a one-year deal with the Brampton Beast of the ECHL on September 15, 2014.

Personal life
Tyler and his brother Justin are actively involved in the Points for Cancer fund, with money for each point either Donati scores being matched by their respective hockey clubs and going towards research to find a cure for ovarian cancer. They joined this organization because their mother Corinne was diagnosed with ovarian cancer in 2003. Following their mother's death in July 2006, the brothers continue Points for Cancer fundraising in her name.

Career statistics

Awards
2009–10 CCM U+ ECHL Most Valuable Player
2009–10 Leading Scorer

References

External links

1986 births
Living people
Belleville Bulls players
Binghamton Senators players
Brampton Beast players
Canadian expatriate ice hockey players in Switzerland
Canadian ice hockey right wingers
Chicago Express players
Connecticut Whale (AHL) players
Elmira Jackals (ECHL) players
Hartford Wolf Pack players
Ice hockey people from Ontario
Motor City Mechanics players
Ontario Junior Hockey League players
Oshawa Generals players
People from Oakville, Ontario
Philadelphia Phantoms players
Toronto St. Michael's Majors players
Canadian twins
Twin sportspeople
 HC Thurgau players
HC TWK Innsbruck players
Vålerenga Ishockey players
Canadian expatriate ice hockey players in Austria
Canadian expatriate ice hockey players in Norway
Canadian expatriate ice hockey players in the United States